Dalibor Veselinović (Serbian Cyrillic: Далибор Веселиновић; born 21 September 1987) is a Serbian retired professional footballer who played as a striker.

Club career
Veselinović started his senior career with OFK Beograd, making his debut during the 2005–06 season. He spent three years at the club, except a six-month loan period with Dinamo Vranje in the 2006–07 season.

In the summer of 2008, Veselinović signed for French Ligue 2 side Lens. He played four league matches for the club and scored one goal.

In the summer of 2009, Veselinović moved to Belgium and signed with Brussels. After his fantastic performances for the Brussels-based club, he signed for their cross-city rivals Anderlecht in December 2010, penning a 4.5-year deal. Veselinović spent the following three seasons on loan with Kortrijk, Beerschot and Waasland-Beveren.

In June 2014, he signed a permanent contract with KV Mechelen. Veselinović left the club after two and a half years in January 2017, after which he signed with Incheon United FC. After Incheon, he played half a year for French club Gazélec Ajaccio.

On 24 August 2018, Veselinović signed a one-year contract with Premier League of Bosnia and Herzegovina club HŠK Zrinjski Mostar. After his contract with Zrinjski expired in May 2019, he decided to leave the club.

In August 2019, Veselinović ended his playing career at only the age of 31, stating that returning injuries were the biggest factor of that decision.

International career
Veselinović made two appearances for the Serbian national under-21 team in 2007.

Honours

Player

Club
Lens
Ligue 2: 2008–09

Anderlecht
Belgian Super Cup: 2012

References

External links
Dalibor Veselinović at Sofascore

1987 births
Living people
Sportspeople from Zadar
Serbs of Croatia
Serbian footballers
Association football forwards
Serbia under-21 international footballers
OFK Beograd players
FK Dinamo Vranje players
Serbian SuperLiga players
RC Lens players
Ligue 2 players
R.W.D.M. Brussels F.C. players
R.S.C. Anderlecht players
K.V. Kortrijk players
Beerschot A.C. players
S.K. Beveren players
K.V. Mechelen players
Incheon United FC players
Gazélec Ajaccio players
HŠK Zrinjski Mostar players
Belgian Pro League players
K League 1 players
Premier League of Bosnia and Herzegovina players
Serbian expatriate footballers
Expatriate footballers in France
Serbian expatriate sportspeople in France
Expatriate footballers in Belgium
Serbian expatriate sportspeople in Belgium
Expatriate footballers in South Korea
Serbian expatriate sportspeople in South Korea
Expatriate footballers in Bosnia and Herzegovina
Serbian expatriate sportspeople in Bosnia and Herzegovina